VC Argex Duvel Puurs is a Belgian volleyball club from Puurs, Belgium. 

The men's A squad currently plays in the Liga, the highest level of Belgian men's volleyball. The B team plays at the fourth level of the Belgian volleyball league pyramid. The C squad play in the provincial leagues, as well as the 2 women's teams of the club.

Current squad
Coach:  Claudio Gewehr

External links
Official site 

 

Belgian volleyball clubs